Lance Michael Dickson (born October 19, 1969) is an American former professional baseball player who was a pitcher for the  Chicago Cubs of Major League Baseball (MLB) in 1990. He threw left-handed and batted right-handed.

Amateur career
Dickson was born in Fullerton, California, and graduated from Grossmont High School in El Cajon in 1987. He was drafted by the Houston Astros in the 37th round (953rd overall) of the 1987 MLB Draft. Dickson did not sign with the team, opting to go to college and try to improve his draft prospects. He attended the University of Arizona, and in 1989 he played collegiate summer baseball with the Orleans Cardinals of the Cape Cod Baseball League, where he was named the most valuable pitcher of the league's All-Star Game. He was selected in the first round of the 1990 MLB Draft (23rd overall) by the Chicago Cubs, and signed with them seven days later.

Professional career
Dickson played in 11 minor league games and went 7–3 with a very low 0.94 ERA. He also recorded 111 strikeouts in 76 innings. After this performance he was called up to the major leagues and made his debut as the Cubs' starting pitcher on August 9, 1990. The second-youngest player in the league at the time of his promotion, Dickson's big-league career was nonetheless short-lived. He went 0–3 with a 7.24 ERA in his three starts, precipitating his return to the AAA Iowa Cubs. His last major league appearance was August 18, 1990.

After he went back to the minor leagues, he was chosen by the American Association managers as the best pitching prospect and possessor of the best breaking ball in the league. His record was 4-3 and had a 2.86 ERA in his 15 starts. He led the league with 92 strikeouts in 91 innings before he was injured by a stress fracture in his right foot in June 1991. During the following off-season he had arm surgery. He returned to the minor leagues after the surgery and retired from baseball in 1995.

References

External links
Dickson's career stats
Dickson's stat page at thebaseballcube.com

1969 births
Living people
Chicago Cubs players
Arizona Wildcats baseball players
Orleans Firebirds players
Major League Baseball pitchers
Baseball players from California
Peoria Chiefs players
Geneva Cubs players
Charlotte Knights players
Iowa Cubs players
Orlando Cubs players
Daytona Cubs players
Gulf Coast Cubs players